— Last lines from William Shakespeare's Sonnet 18, published this year and, four centuries later, still "eternal lines"

Nationality words link to articles with information on the nation's poetry or literature (for instance, Irish or France).

Events
May 20 – London publisher Thomas Thorpe issues Shake-speares Sonnets, with a dedication to "Mr. W.H.", and the poem A Lover's Complaint appended; it is uncertain whether this publication has Shakespeare's authority.
October 12 – A version of the rhyme "Three Blind Mice" is published in Deuteromelia or The Seconde part of Musicks melodie (London). The editor, and possible author of the verse, is the teenage Thomas Ravenscroft.

Works in English

 Robert Armin:
 The Italian Taylor, and his Boy
 The History of the Two Maids of More-clacke
 George Chapman, Homer Prince of Poets, translation of Homer's Iliad, published about this year
 Samuel Daniel completes the eighth and last book of his epic poem, The Civile Wars Betweene the Howses of Lancaster and Yorke Corrected and Continued (also known as Civil Wars)
 John Davies:
 The Holy Roode; or, Christs Crosse
 Humours Heav'n on Earth: With the civile warres of death and fortune
 Thomas Heywood, Troia Britanica; or, Great Britaines Troy, translated in part from Ovid
 Gervase Markham, The Famous Whore, or Noble Curtizan, based on Joachim Du Bellay's La vielle courtisane
 Samuel Rowlands, A Whole Crew of Kind Gossips, published anonymously, includes "Tis Merrie When Gossips Meete" (1602)
 William Shakespeare, Shake-speares Sonnets
 Edmund Spenser, Two Cantos of Mutabilitie published together with a reprint of The Fairie Queene
 John Wilbye, The Second Set of Madrigales

Works published in other languages
 Luis Belmonte Bermúdez, Vida del Padre Maestro Ignacio de Loyola ("Life of Father Ignatius of Loyola"), an epic poem on the saint's life Spain
 Marc Lescarbot, Les Muses de la Nouvelle-France, French Canada

Births
 February 10 – John Suckling (died 1642), English
 August 19 – Jean Rotrou (died 1650), French poet and tragedian
 October 5 – Paul Fleming (died 1640), German

Deaths
 March 9 – William Warner (born c. 1558), English
 December 4 – Alexander Hume (born c. 1560), Scottish
 December – Barnabe Barnes (born c. 1571) English
 date not known
 Anthony Copley (born 1567), English Catholic poet and conspirator
 Kanaka Dasa (born 1509), Karnatakan poet, philosopher, musician and composer

Notes

17th-century poetry
Poetry